

Events
 Hartmann von Aue completes the Middle High German verse romance Iwein
 Raimbaut de Vaqueiras leaves the Italian courts to join the Fourth Crusade
 As stated in the historical book , Teika presented a first clean draft of prospective Shinkokinshū poems to Go-Toba in April
 In November, Go-Toba hosted a ninetieth-birthday celebration for Shunzei - a rare honour considering Go-Toba's high rank. It was a clear indication that Shunzei's poetry talent was outstanding.

Births

Deaths
 Le Chastelain de Couci (born unknown), a French trouvère

References

13th-century poetry
Poetry